A vacuum truck, vacuum tanker, vactor truck, vactor, vac-con truck, vac-con is a tank truck that has a pump and a tank. The pump is designed to pneumatically suck liquids, sludges, slurries, or  the like from a location (often underground) into the tank of the truck. The objective is to enable transport of the liquid material via road to another location. Vacuum trucks transport the collected material to a treatment or disposal site, for example a sewage treatment plant.

A common material to be transported is septage (or more broadly: fecal sludge) which is human excreta mixed with water, e.g. from septic tanks and pit latrines. They also transport sewage sludge, industrial liquids, or slurries from animal waste from livestock facilities with pens. Vacuum trucks can also be used to prepare a site for installation or to access underground utilities. These trucks may use compressed air or water to break up the ground safely, without risk of damage, before installation may begin.

Vacuum trucks can be equipped with a high pressure pump if they are used to clean out sewers from sand.

Other names used 

Other names used for vacuum trucks: vacuum tanker, "Sucker truck" (in Australia) or "Sewer Sucker", "Hydro-vac", or "vac-trucks" (in Canada) or "Exhauster truck" (in Rwanda, Malawi). Slang terms include: "honey truck", "honey sucker" (in India and South Africa), and "honeywagon", all (probably) derived from honey bucket.

When a vacuum truck is used to transport fecal sludge then it can also be called "fecal sludge truck".

Design and configurations 

Pumps 
They generally use a low-volume sliding vane pump or a liquid ring pump to create a negative air pressure. The use of diaphragm mud pumps is less common, but with the advantage of a simpler design and usually lower overall costs. The disadvantage is that mechanical parts come into contact with the sludge, which is not the case for the more common vacuum pumps.

The truck can be configured to be a direct belt drive, or a hydraulic drive system.

There are two different ways to mount the pump: either directly on the truck with the vacuum drive powered by the truck motor, or on the trailer with an independent motor. The second option with the independent motor is more complicated and not commonly used. It has the advantage of potentially having the pump closer to the septic tank. It is also able to use the negative pressure suction side of the pump as well as the positive pressure side to pump sludge over longer distances or lift it higher into the tank.

Suction hoses 
The suction hoses are typically 2" - 4" (or 50mm to 100mm) in diameter with 3" (or 75mm) being the norm. The possible length depends on various factors mainly related to the lift and other pressure losses. It is usually impossible to extend it beyond .

An inherent suction limitation of all suction pumps is that they can only lift a liquid through utilizing atmospheric pressure. However, due to the viscosity of fecal sludge it is possible to mix air into it either by sucking close from the surface or by adding air with a compressor through a separate hose. Through this process, the overall density of the sludge/air mixture can be reduced below that of pure water and thus a higher lift can be reached under optimal conditions. Other factors affecting the possible lift and total length of the suction hose are that single stage vacuum pumps only reach an 85-90% partial vacuum, and that small air leakages, pipe friction losses, and the viscosity of the liquid further reduce the possible lift.

Emptying the tanker
Normally a tanker is emptied by gravity. It is possible to pressurize the vacuum tank to "pressure out" the liquid quicker (or against a small difference in elevation). This procedure is detrimental for the equipment, hence is used in special situations.

The outlet is typically  in diameter. The discharge time depends on the thickness of the sludge, the size of the outlet valve and hose, the amount of garbage in the fecal sludge, and the frequency of driver cleaning the dump screen.

Uses
Vacuum trucks are used by town and municipal governments, as well as commercial entities around the world.

Human excreta 
Several types of non-centralized sanitation systems are served by vacuum trucks. They are used to empty septage from cesspits, septic tanks, pit latrines, and communal latrines, for street cleanup, for sewer clean out, and for individual septic systems. The trucks are used in the cleaning of sanitary sewer pumping stations. Vacuum trucks are used to empty portable toilets. In commercial aviation, vacuum trucks are used to collect waste from airplane toilets.

Vacuum trucks discharge these wastes to the sewer network, to a wastewater treatment plant, or—usually illegally, for example in many developing countries— directly into the environment. The latter practice, called "institutionalised open defecation", is dangerous since it constitutes a public health and environmental hazard.

Industrial liquids 
Vacuum trucks are used in the petroleum industry, for cleaning of storage tanks and spills. They are also an important part of drilling oil and natural gas wells, as they are located at the drilling site. Vacuum trucks are used to remove drilling mud, drilling cuttings, cement, spills, and for removal of brine water from production tanks. They dispose of this in sump pits, treatment plants or if within safe levels may be spread in farm fields.

Others 
Vacuum trucks are also used for exposing underground utilities. Before installing many pieces of underground equipment, the ground must to be excavated far enough down to create a solid foundation for the structure to be placed on. Underground utilities can include lamp poles, traffic lights, road signs, and even commercial grade trees for landscaping.

To prepare the ground for installation it is jetted with water, and the vacuum truck sucks up the muddy product. This exposes the buried utility without the possibility of damage, as would be possible if a digging machine were used (i.e. tractor backhoe, tracked or wheeled excavator, ditch witches).

Vacuum trucks can also be used for cleanup of contaminated soil. For some instances, air excavation many be used in place of hydro excavation. Air excavation, also known as soft dig, uses compressed air to break up the ground and then vacuums up the soil into the debris tank. Air excavation is often used for locating underground electrical cables and gas lines.

Examples

Bangalore, India
Assuming a 2-year emptying cycle one truck can cater to about 3,000 to 4,000 buildings or 15,000 to 20,000 people. Vacuum trucks are an alternative to the dangerous and humiliating practice of manual scavenging that became illegal in India with the Manual Scavenging Act of 1993. In the city of Bangalore alone, it is estimated that there were up to 200 such trucks in 2012, serving more than 3 million people. These vacuum trucks are operated by private companies without the need for subsidies. The charge for emptying a septic tank is between 1,200 and 3,000 Rupees (USD 24 and 60) every two years. After three months of composting, a truckload of compost can be sold for 1,500 to 2,000 Rupees (USD 30 to 40). In the Bangalore area, compost is used primarily on banana and coconut trees.

Compost can generate revenues since it replaces expensive fertilizer. If septage is discharged on land for composting, each vacuum truck requires  of land for composting.

See also
 Gong farmer
 Gully emptier
 Suction excavator

References

External links 

 Factsheet on motorised emptying and transport

Waste collection vehicles
Waste management in India
Industrial equipment
Cleaning tools
Trucks
Sewerage infrastructure
Sanitation